GyazMail is an email client for macOS, developed and maintained by Japanese programmer Goichi Hirakawa. It supports the POP3, IMAP and SMTP protocols. Its handling of multiple email accounts includes local mailboxes.

Gyazmail is based on the native macOS Cocoa and written in Objective-C. For its search function, GyazMail uses the Oniguruma regular expression library, which supports a variety of character encodings, which is especially relevant for Asian languages.

Version 1.0.1 was released in 2003.

Features
 Supports IMAP, POP3 and local storage folders
 An option exists for setting maximum line width when sending mails. This is helpful where autowrap is not supported, such as for newsgroups, which require a maximum line with of 72 characters, with a hard wrap.
 Message threading is supported
 Multiple accounts
 Sorting rules for incoming and outgoing mail can be defined

References

External links
 Official website

MacOS email clients
Unix Internet software